Mess is the second studio album by Australian melodic punk/alternative rock band The Hard Aches, released on 13 April 2018 by Anchorhead Records. It was produced by Sam Johnson and recorded at Holes and Corners in Melbourne in September 2017.

Background and promotion
Mess was recorded in September 2017, over three weeks, with the band working six-day weeks, then flying out to play live on weekends. In late January 2018, the band released a new single, "Mess". The single premiered on Triple J's show Good Nights, where the band announced it as the title track of their upcoming second album, and also announced an upcoming national tour to support the release of the album.

In March 2018, the band released "Happy", the second single from the album, which features guest vocals from Camp Cope vocalist/guitarist Georgia "Maq" McDonald.

On 13 April 2018, The Hard Aches released Mess, their second album. The band kicked off their album tour the same day Mess released, performing seven shows nationally.

Critical reception

The album received positive reviews. The AU Review gave the album a positive review and said it was "a career-defining effort from The Hard Aches." Kill Your Stereo praised the album, describing it as an: "utter belter of a record, the kind of killer album that I have been hoping The Hard Aches would make for a long while now". Beat Magazine gave the album a positive review and said: "shining with raw honesty, The Hard Aches prove that they’ve found their unique rhythm." In another positive review, Upside Adelaide wrote, "This is an album that will make you feel something, but it will also sweep you up and have you singing along." Hysteria Magazine were less enthused, stating "The Hard Aches deliver in skillful songwriting but their minimal instrumentation doesn’t quite satisfy".

Track listing
Track listing adapted from BandCamp.

Personnel
The Hard Aches
 Ben David – lead vocals, guitar
 Alex Upton – drums

Additional musicians
 Georgia McDonald – guest vocals on "Happy" and "Family"
 Jeff Rosenstock – guest vocals on "Friendship"
 Craig Selak (formerly of The Bennies) – guest vocals on "Outline"
 Sam Johnson – guest vocals on "Terrible Things"
 Dougie Rankin – trombone on "I Feel Like I'm Dying" and "Family"

Production
 Sam Johnson – producer and mixing
 William Bowden – mastering

Design
 Annie Walter – artwork
 Jay Wennington – photography
 Matt Walter – photography

Charts

Release history

References

2018 albums
The Hard Aches albums